The 1967 UCI Track Cycling World Championships were the World Championship for track cycling. They took place in Amsterdam, Netherlands from 22 to 27 August 1967. Eleven events were contested, 9 for men (3 for professionals, 6 for amateurs) and 2 for women.

Medal summary

Medal table

See also

 1967 UCI Road World Championships

References

Track cycling
UCI Track Cycling World Championships by year
International cycle races hosted by the Netherlands
1967 in track cycling
August 1967 sports events in Europe
1960s in Amsterdam
Cycling in Amsterdam